Johannes Rahn (born 16 January 1986 in Hachenburg) is a German footballer who plays for SV Eintracht Windhagen.

Rahn made his professional debut for TuS Koblenz during the first round of fixtures of the 2006–07 2. Bundesliga season away to MSV Duisburg.

References

External links 
 

1986 births
Living people
People from Westerwaldkreis
German footballers
Association football forwards
TuS Koblenz players
VfB Stuttgart II players
Arminia Bielefeld players
SC Fortuna Köln players
SV Elversberg players
2. Bundesliga players
3. Liga players
Regionalliga players
Footballers from Rhineland-Palatinate